Mykola Savolaynen (born 25 March 1980) is a Ukrainian triple jumper.

His personal best jump is 17.08 metres, achieved in August 2002 in Donetsk.

Competition record

References

External links

1980 births
Living people
Ukrainian male triple jumpers
Athletes (track and field) at the 2004 Summer Olympics
Athletes (track and field) at the 2008 Summer Olympics
Olympic athletes of Ukraine
Universiade medalists in athletics (track and field)
Universiade bronze medalists for Ukraine
Competitors at the 2003 Summer Universiade
Medalists at the 2005 Summer Universiade